The Yocha Dehe Wintun Nation is a federally recognized tribe of Wintun people, specifically Patwin people or southern Wintun, in Yolo County, California. They were formerly known as the Rumsey Indian Rancheria of Wintun Indians of California.

Government
The Yocha Dehe Wintun Nation is headquartered in Brooks, California. A democratically elected, five-person tribal council govern the tribe and operate tribal services and business ventures, such as Yocha Dehe Wintun Academy, Yocha Dehe Fire Department, Yocha Dehe Community Fund, Yocha Dehe Farm and Ranch, Cultural Resources Department, Health and Wellness Department, Environmental Department, Tribal Gaming Agency, and Cache Creek Casino Resort. The current tribal administration is as follows:

 Chairman: Anthony Roberts
 Secretary: James Kinter
 Treasurer: Leland Kinter
 Council Member: Yvonne Perkins
 Council Member: Diamond Lomeli

Reservation
The tribe's reservation is the Rumsey Rancheria, a federally recognized ranchería in the Coast Range. Established in 1907, the rancheria is 185 acres large.

Culture
The Yocha Dehe Wintun are Patwin people, whose traditional territories are near the Sacramento River valley. The Patwin language is a Penutian language. Traditional subsistence included fishing king salmon, harvesting acorns, hunting, and gathering vegetables.

Economic development
The Yocha Dehe Wintun Nation owns and operates the Cache Creek Casino Resort, which included a hotel, spa, and golf course, as well as several restaurants: C2 Steak and Seafood, Chang Shou, The Sports Page, Harvest Buffet, Canyon Cafe, The Deli, Asian Kitchen, Sweets Etc., and Loco Express, all located in Brooks.

The tribe's agricultural interests include wine grapes and arbequina olives. They package and market many of their products, including olive oils, vinegar and wine under the brand Seka Hills. They have two retail stores and tasting rooms in Yolo County, one in Brooks and one in Clarksburg in the Sacramento-San Joaquin Delta.

Education
The ranchería is served by the Esparto Unified School District.

See also
Indigenous peoples of California

Notes

References
 Pritzker, Barry M. A Native American Encyclopedia: History, Culture, and Peoples. Oxford: Oxford University Press, 2000.

External links
 Yocha Dehe Wintun Nation, official website
 The Rumsey Band of the Wintun Indians: A Return to Self Sufficiency

Native American tribes in California
Federally recognized tribes in the United States
Wintun
Patwin
Yolo County, California